Bruce N. Levine (born February 7, 1955, in New York City) is a trainer of Thoroughbred racehorses.

Raised on Long Island, New York, where he still makes his home, Levine earned a Bachelor of Arts degree in business administration from the University of Miami before becoming a trainer. He saddled his first race winner in 1979 and as of the fall of 2009 has won more than 2,200 races. He won a training title at Meadowlands Racetrack in 2007 and at Monmouth Park Racetrack in 2008 and 2009.

References
 Bruce N. Levine at the NTRA
 Bruce Levine profile at TGC Stable

1955 births
Living people
University of Miami Business School alumni
American horse trainers
People from Long Island